Russin is a surname. Notable people with the surname include: 

 Babe Russin (1911–1984), American musician
 Robert Russin (1914–2007), American sculptor
 Robin Russin, American playwright, screenwriter, author, and educator

See also
 Rusin (surname)
 Russini (surname)